Central Plains USD 112 is a public unified school district (USD) headquartered in Holyrood, Kansas, United States.  The district includes the communities of Holyrood, Bushton, Claflin, Dorrance, Frederick, Lorraine, Wilson, Beaver, Dubuque, Odin, Hitschmann, and nearby rural areas.

Schools
The school district operates the following schools:
 Central Plains Jr/Sr High School in Claflin
 Central Plains Elementary School in Holyrood
 Wilson Jr/Sr High School in Wilson, closing in spring 2023
 Wilson Elementary School in Wilson

History
The USD was formed in 2010 from the merger of Lorraine USD 328 and Claflin USD 354.

Wilson Jr/Sr High School will be closing in spring 2023.

See also
 Kansas State Department of Education
 Kansas State High School Activities Association
 List of high schools in Kansas
 List of unified school districts in Kansas

References

External links
 

School districts in Kansas
Education in Barton County, Kansas
Ellsworth County, Kansas
Education in Rice County, Kansas
School districts established in 2010
2010 establishments in Kansas